Race Gurram is a 2014 Indian Telugu-language action comedy film directed by Surender Reddy and produced by Nallamalupu Srinivas under his banner Sri Lakshmi Narasimha Productions. The film stars Allu Arjun and Shruti Haasan while Shaam and Ravi Kishan play supporting roles. S. Thaman composed the music.

Principal photography began on 13 May 2013 in Hyderabad with the entire shoot completed on 22 February 2014. The film released worldwide on 11 April 2014 to positive reviews. The film marked Allu Arjun's first film to gross over 100 crore. It went on to earn Filmfare Awards for Best Actor, Best Actress and Best Playback Singer – Male.

Plot
Ram Prasad and Lakshman "Lucky" Prasad are brothers and polar opposites. While the former is an honorable ACP, the latter is a happy-guy who is constantly at odds with his brother. Madhali Shiva Reddy is a mercenary turned politician. He holds a squad of police officers at gunpoint, and forces Rajeev to kill his commanding officer, ACP Sameer, to save the lives of the rest of the officers. Ram is motivated to prevent Shiva Reddy's participation in the upcoming elections.  

One day, Lucky meets Spandana, daughter of Bheem Prakash, in an elevator. He notices that she doesn't react to anything, maintaining the same expression and remaining calm no matter what happens. When she refuses to look scared during a bank robbery, even after being threatened with a gun, Lucky asks her why she is like this. Spandana says that she feels all emotions 'inside'. Her father, Bheem Prakash, taught her to be in control of her emotions. Lucky, who has fallen in love with Spandana, calls it rubbish, and vows to bring a change in her. 

After meeting Lucky on a regular basis, she learns to show her emotions and reciprocates his love. Ram learns of Lucky's relationship and informs Prakash that his daughter is roaming with a lazy and spoilt guy as retribution for a previous prank. Prakash instantly dislikes Lucky, and tells him that he cannot marry his daughter. Lucky and Ram have a serious fight, where Lucky is slapped by his mother for the first time. Shaken and enraged, he steals Ram's jeep, in which Ram was transporting files that incriminated Shiva Reddy in numerous crimes. Lucky is then attacked by Shiva Reddy's men, who mistake him to be Ram, and the Jeep goes up in flames along with the files. Lucky beats up the goons, who try to tell him that they were planning to murder Ram. Upon hearing this, Lucky is enraged. He kidnaps Shiva Reddy and beats him up, tying him upside down to a tree. Shiva Reddy is hospitalized. 

Lucky then visits Shiva Reddy's father Peddi Reddy and confesses. He talks about how he used to hate his brother, but has now realized that he loves his brother very much, which was why he reacted the way he did. Peddi Reddy motivates Shiva Reddy to attack and take revenge on Lucky. Lucky decides to reunite Ram with the woman he used to love, so that Ram would not interfere with his love story. After a few hilarious twists, his plan works. 

After recovering and being elected as an MLA, Shiva Reddy uses his influence and starts to take revenge on Lucky and his family. He gets Ram suspended by paying a woman to claim that she was harassed by Ram, and has the government demolish the family's house, claiming that it was illegally built. Ram is then informed that it was Lucky that stole his Jeep. Ram is furious and kicks Lucky out of the family after berating him for what his mistake has cost them. 

Lucky is abducted by Shiva Reddy, who brutally beats him and leaves him hanging from the same tree Lucky hung him from. Lucky escapes and plans to take revenge with the help of Home Minister Govardhan, who owes Lucky for his promotion from MLA to Home Minister. Lucky fools Govardhan by convincing him he is suffering from cancer and has only one day to live. Govardhan says he will grant any wish Lucky asks, and Lucky requests to be instated as a special officer and asks Govardhan to do a solitary 12-hour ritual for Lucky's survival. Govardhan agrees. Lucky is in charge of a team of police officers including Kill Bill Pandey, a frustrated police officer who takes the lead and helps Lucky destroy Shiva Reddy's properties, not knowing Lucky is a fake police officer. Lucky sends Pandey to Shiva Reddy in person to get a list of his factories under the pretense that they'll know which factories to not raid. Using the list and the media, the special forces team invades and exposes Shiva Reddy's illegal operations. Govardhan's prayer finishes and after the CM scolds him of his mistake, Govardhan seeks Ram's help. 

Lucky fights and defeats Shiva Reddy, but after he cuffs him, Ram appears and cuffs Lucky. Govardhan and the CM want to publicly hang Lucky for his illegal actions and for humiliating them, but Ram tells them that people wouldn't take well to killing the man who exposed Shiva Reddy. He reveals that the public was planning to re-elect the same government in the next elections. Lucky uses this opportunity and convinces (aka blackmails) the CM and Govardhan to continue this special-force team and give police officers full powers. Shiva Reddy is shot to death by Rajeev. Lucky and Ram reunite with their family.

Cast

Allu Arjun as Lakshman Prasad "Lucky", a carefree man who wants to settle in the United States and frequently argues with his brother Ram.
Shruti Hassan as Spandana "Sweety", an emotionless girl who becomes expressive when she meets and falls in love with Lucky. 
Shaam as Assistant Commissioner Ram Prasad, Lucky's elder brother and a sincere and honorable cop who always does things by the book.
Ravi Kishan as Heavy Industries Minister Maddali Shiva Reddy, who was a rowdy before becoming a crooked minister.
Prakash Raj as Bheem Prakash, Spandana's millionaire father.
Bramhanandam as Inspector Kill Bill Pandey, a frustrated and skilled special police officer.
Saloni as Sweta, Ram's love interest who broke up with him because of Lucky's mischief, and years later marries Ram after Lucky reconciles them.
Ali as Dr. Bali, MBBS, a fake doctor who helps Ram reunite with Shweta and helps Lucky con Govardhan.
M. S. Narayana as the man Lucky considers his uncle.
Posani Krishna Murali as Home Minister Govardhan. He owes his promotion to Lucky, who made it seem like Govardhan saved a boy who was hit by a car.
Jaya Prakash Reddy as J. P., the chief cop.
Mukesh Rishi as Peddi Reddy, Shiva Reddy's father.
Pragathi as Spandana's mother.
Tanikella Bharani as Lucky and Ram's father
Pavitra Lokesh as Lucky and Ram's mother
Kota Srinivasa Rao as Hanumayya, Civil Supplies Minister and Coalition Party Leader.
Sayaji Shinde as Chief Minister
Srinivasa Reddy as Lucky's friend
Thagubothu Ramesh as Lucky's friend
Rajiv Kanakala as Rajeev, a cop who was forced to kill his commanding officer lest his entire squad be killed.
Paruchuri Venkateswara Rao as Ram's colleague's father
Duvvasi Mohan as Konda, Ram's friend and police officer
Raghu Babu as Thief
Narsing Yadav
Dhandapani
Sudigali Sudheer as Spandana's car driver
Raghu Karumanchi as Peddi Reddy's henchman
Kyra Dutt as special appearance in “Bhoochade”

Production

Development and filming 

It was reported in the early September 2012 that Surender Reddy would direct Allu Arjun in this film which was announced to be produced by Nallamalupu Bujji. It was titled Race Gurram in the end of October 2012. This was the first film for Allu Arjun with Surender Reddy and S. Thaman. The film was launched on 24 October 2012, the day of Vijayadasami, at Ramanaidu Studios in Hyderabad. Chiranjeevi, Allu Aravind, Nallamalupu Srinivas (Bujji), Dr. Venkateswara Rao, D. Ramanaidu, K. Raghavendra Rao, Nagababu, Ali, V. V. Vinayak, Rana Daggubati, Shyam Prasad Reddy, Vakkantham Vamsi graced the event. D. Ramanaidu did the formal pooja and Chiranjeevi gave the clap. V. V. Vinayak directed the first shot while Shyam Prasad Reddy switched on the Camera. One of the producers, Dr. Venkateshwar Rao said that the Regular shoot would start in December after the Completion of Allu Arjun's Iddarammayilatho. During the film's launch, it was reported that Vijayan would provide the fights and thrills in the film. Initially Samantha was approached for female lead in it, but later Shruti Haasan was selected as the Heroine, which was confirmed by the actress in her Twitter. It was declared that the regular shooting would start from 2 May 2013 aiming a Vijaya Dasami Release. However, due to some delay, the regular shooting started from 13 May 2013 in Hyderabad.

After completing the first schedule in Hyderabad, the team headed to Norway for canning some important scenes including some of the songs, making it a long schedule. At that point of time, it was reported that Surender Reddy roped in Shaam after he worked with him in Kick and Oosaravelli. Meanwhile, after the completion of the shoot at Norway, the unit proceeded to Europe (Switzerland, Italy) where 2 songs were scheduled to be canned in a period of 8 days ranging from 1 July 2013 after which the regular shoot would continue in Hyderabad. However, the shooting resumed in Geneva which later continued in Milan. At this point of time, Saloni was selected as the second heroine in the film which marks her first collaboration with Allu Arjun and Surender Reddy. Later on the unit returned to Hyderabad and Allu Arjun and Shruti Haasan participated in the shooting at Annapurna Studios 7 Acres. There the song "Cinema Choopista Maava" was shot under the choreography of Johnny Master. After the completion of the song shoot, Allu Arjun participated in a fight scene shoot which was choreographed by noted fight masters Ram-Lakshman. In early September 2013, it was confirmed that Bhojpuri Superstar Ravi Kishan was roped in as the antagonist thus marking this film his Telugu Debut.

Later in September, some scenes were canned on Allu Arjun and others at Golconda Fort in Hyderabad. Later on some fight scenes were canned in and around Hyderabad in which the leads participated. On the night of 28 October 2013 scenes between Allu Arjun and Shaam were shot at Hell pad Junction in Ramoji Film City at Hyderabad. In early November 2013, shooting continued in Ramoji Film City where some comedy scenes were shot. From 16 November 2013 some action sequences were canned in which Allu Arjun participated. The shooting continued in Ramoji Film City and the unit shot some more fight sequences at the outskirts of Hyderabad from 19 November 2013. The shooting continued in Jadcherla where scenes on Allu Arjun, Brahmanandam and Ravi Kishan were shot. Later some crucial scenes were shot near Charminar area in Hyderabad. After wrapping up a chase sequence on Allu Arjun and Shruti Haasan there, the unit yet again continued its shooting at Ramoji Film City. By then Surender Reddy revealed that most of the film's shoot had been wrapped up. On 24 December, it was announced that the film's talkie part was completed and 2 songs were left to be shot which would start form the new schedule which would commence from 5 January 2014.

On 5 January, the new schedule yet again began at Ramoji Film City, Hyderabad where some crucial scenes and an item number will be shot. It was said that the last song's shoot was said to be held from 20 to 25 January with which the filming would come to an end. Later on 13 January 2014 a song was shot on Allu Arjun and Kaira Dutta in which Thagubothu Ramesh and Srinivas Reddy also participated. It was said to be the introduction song of Allu Arjun in the film which was composed by Dinesh Master. A song was planned to be shot on Allu Arjun and Shruti Haasan from 15 February. However, since the latter had a surgery, the filming of the song was shifted to 17 February. In February 2014, it was reported that Veteran Kannada and Telugu actress Pavitra Lokesh is playing the role of Allu Arjun's Mother in this film. Meanwhile, on 20 February Shruti Haasan announced that she wrapped up her part of the shoot. The song's shoot came to an end on 22 February 2014 thus ending the film's shoot. In mid March 2014, it was reported that Brahmanandam would play the role of a police officer in this film. In an interview to the IANS, Brahmanandam told that he and Allu Arjun play the roles of partners in Police Department. He said "I play his assistant in the film and scenes between us are a laugh riot. I'm extremely happy with the character because it's something I haven't played in a long time. I'm sure audiences are going to love watching us together on screen". Sunil gave voice-over for the film.

Post production
The post production activities commenced during the final phase of shooting and by the end of March, it was reported that the film's post production activities are in full swing at Chennai B2h Studios. On 29 March, it was reported that Thaman completed the re-recording work for the first half of the film and the second half's re-recording work is in progress. At the same time, it was also reported that film's unit is striving hard to ensure that the film's first cut is ready by 31 March. It was said that as soon as the activities come to an end, the film's first copy would be screened for undergoing censor certification. On 4 April 2014 the film was certified a U/A certificate by Central Board of Film Certification with the film's length being 163 minutes. The final copy of the film was ready on 4 April 2014.

Marketing
The film's first look was released on 7 December 2013. The teaser was released on the same day at 10:00 AM in the Morning on the occasion of Surender Reddy's birthday in YouTube. The Teaser was of 30 seconds in which Arjun runs in a Black shirt and Black Trousers with Black Goggles with the Background Music notching the word Boochodu (Bogeyman) with Ravi Kishan's eyes highlighted twice. The teaser received positive response from fans of Arjun as well as common audience. The Audio release poster featuring Allu Arjun and Shruti Haasan was released on 13 March 2014 in High Quality version after the low quality version released into the Internet. That poster received viral response from all corners. On 16 March 2014 the teasers of all the six songs were released into YouTube officially by the makers.

The hot pose featuring Allu Arjun and Shruti Haasan went viral. Before the music launch was held in a low key affair at Park Hyatt, it was reported that the makers opted for organizing a big fanfare event before the film's release. After the Audio released into the market, it was reported that the film's theatrical trailer would be launched in a function held at Rajahmundry on 22 March 2014. The venue was confirmed on 21 March 2014 as the GIET college youth fest in Rajamundry. The trailer received positive response from all corners. It was reported that the producers ordered unique light based standees featuring a dancing still of Allu Arjun and each of these standees costed around 10,000. It was said that the producer has ordered around 50 standees and keep it prominently in all multiplexes and important single screens.

Music

S. Thaman composed the Music and Background Score for this film which marks his first collaboration with Allu Arjun and second collaboration with Surender Reddy. Later in early March 2014, Thaman confirmed that the film's audio would be launched on 16 March at Hyderabad. The film's Soundtrack Album was released in a simple and formal promotional event on 16 March 2014 at Park Hyatt hotel in Hyderabad. The Audio received predominant positive response from all corners and many celebrities praised Thaman for his work. The soundtrack also debuted as one among the top ten albums in iTunes along with Maan Karate and Kochadaiiyaan.

Marketing
The film's first look was released on 7 December 2013. The teaser trailer was released on the same day at 10:00 AM in the morning on the occasion of Surender Reddy's birthday in YouTube. The Teaser was of 30 seconds in which Arjun runs in a Black shirt and Black Trousers with Black Goggles with the Background Music notching the word Boochodu (Bogeyman) with Ravi Kishan's eyes highlighted twice. The teaser received positive response from fans of Arjun as well as common audience. The Audio release poster featuring Allu Arjun and Shruti Haasan was released on 13 March 2014 in High Quality version after the low quality version released into the Internet. That poster received viral response from all corners. On 16 March 2014 the teasers of all the six songs were released into YouTube officially by the makers.

The still featuring Allu Arjun and Shruti Haasan went viral. Before the music launch was held in a low key affair at Park Hyatt, it was reported that the makers opted for organizing a big fanfare event before the film's release. After the Audio released into the market, it was reported that the film's theatrical trailer would be launched in a function held at Rajahmundry on 22 March 2014. The venue was confirmed on 21 March 2014 as the GIET college youth fest in Rajamundry. The trailer received positive response from all corners. It was reported that the producers ordered unique light based standees featuring a dancing still of Allu Arjun and each of these standees costed around 10,000. It was said that the producer has ordered around 50 standees and keep it prominently in all multiplexes and important single screens.

Release
Initially, the film was planned as a Vijayadashami release viz. 13 October 2013. However it was later shifted to 11 January 2014 as a Sankranti special along with Mahesh Babu's 1 – Nenokkadine. In the end of November 2013, it was confirmed that the film would be using the Auro 11.1 Audio file format by Barco Sounds thus making it the third Telugu movie to adopt this next-generation three-layer sound technology from Auro Technologies, powered by Barco Sounds which was succeeded by Mahesh Babu's 1 – Nenokkadine. But in early December 2013, it was confirmed that the film's release postponed again thus exiting the Sankranti race. Then it was declared that it would hit the screens in February 2014. In the end of December 2013, Reports emerged that the film postponed yet again from February and was slated as a Summer Release.

In the end of January 2014, it was reported that the film would release worldwide on 4 April 2014. In mid February 2014, it was reported that the film is expected to release on 11 April 2014. But on the last day of February 2014, it was reported that the film would release on 28 March 2014 clashing with Nandamuri Balakrishna's Legend which was also slated for a 28 March 2014 release worldwide. On 13 March 2014 FICUS Inc released a press note which stated that they purchased the entire overseas theatrical screening rights of the film. During the theatrical trailer launch at Rajahmundry, Allu Arjun confirmed that the film would release on 11 April 2014. In association with FICUS Inc, European Telugu Colors purchased the theatrical screening rights of the film in Europe except in UK. The film was later dubbed and released in Hindi as Main Hoon Lucky: The Racer in 2015 which grossed more than 121 million views on YouTube.

Home media 
The film's satellite and digital rights were sold to Sun TV Network. The film's world television premiere took place on 23 October 2014, through Gemini TV.

Reception

Critical reception
The Times of India gave the film a rating of three-and-a-half out of five stars and stated that "All in all it’s the ideal Tollywood masala package loaded with the right doses of entertainment, brotherly love, and Brahmanandam. You can’t ask for more can you?". Sify gave the film rating of three-and-a-quarter out of five stars and noted that "'Race Gurram' is a regular commercial entertainer with a dose of comedy in the second half. Allu Arjun and 'Kill Bill' Pandey steal the show". idlebrain.com gave a review stating "Plus points of the movie are Allu Arjun, Brahmanandam, Cinematography, second half screenplay, all round orientation and production values. On the flip side, eccentric villain characterization and uneven tempo of the film should have been taken care of. On a whole, Race Gurram with its allround commercial elements should do well at box office! And watch out for Brahmi as ‘kill bill pandey’!" and rated the film 3.25/5. According to all the reviews and critics Allu Arjun Police Introduction scene is the highlight scene from the entire movie .

Oneindia Entertainment gave a review stating "Race Gurram has excellent performances by lead actors, engrossing narration and rich production values, but lacks a fresh plot. It is a good family entertainer that will also impress the mass audience. It is a must watch movie for Bunny and Surender fans" and rated the film 3.5/5. IndiaGlitz gave a review stating "Race Gurram, for all the powerful imagery it stands for, is not an all-out Allu Arjun film. Although his heroism is enough to captivate the young audience, it's more the very many characters and brother-brother conflict that keep the proceedings interesting. Race Gurram is watchable for the little doses of heroism, romance, and comedy" and rated the film 3.5/5. The Hindu wrote "Race Gurram makes no pretensions to be a hatke film. It is an out and out Allu Arjun film and it makes no bones of that. Directed by Surender Reddy, Race Gurram is a family entertainer with its fair share of action and comedy and a generous dose of Allu Arjun’s dancing skills".

Box office
The film became first Allu Arjun film to earn $1 million in USA. The film collected  nett in 4 weeks, becoming the biggest hit for Allu Arjun. The Malayalam dubbed version Lucky: The Racer was also received good reception at the box office. Race Gurram completed 50 days in 159 centres and 100 days in 26 centres. In its full theatrical run Race Gurram earned over 59.4 crore distributor share and emerged as the highest grossing Telugu film of 2014.

Awards and nominations
Filmfare Awards
Best Actor – Allu Arjun
Best Actress – Shruti Haasan
Best Playback Singer – Male – Simha – "Cinema Choopista Mava"
Nandi Awards
Best Male Comedian – Brahmanandam
Best Male Dubbing Artist – P. Ravi Shankar
CineMAA Awards
Best Film – Nallamalupu Bujji
Best Actor – Allu Arjun
Best Editor – Goutham Raju
SIIMA
Best Director (Telugu) – Surender Reddy
Best Actress (Telugu) – Shruti Haasan
Best Comedian (Telugu) – Brahmanandam
Best Male Playback Singer (Telugu) – Simha – "Cinema Choopista Mava"
Best Dance Choreographer – Johnny – "Cinema Choopista Mava"
B. Nagi Reddy Memorial Award
Best Wholesome Entertainment Telugu Film Award – Nallamalupu Bujji & Dr. Venkateswara Rao
Santosham Film Awards
 Best Producer – Nallamalupu Srinivas & Dr. Venkateswara Rao
Best Choreographer – Jani Master

In popular culture
Kapil Dev praised Allu Arjun's work in this film when Allu Arjun and his wife Sneha Reddy met him. Kapil told him that he watches his Hindi-dubbed films.

References

External links
 

Films shot in Norway
2014 films
2014 masala films
Indian action comedy films
Films directed by Surender Reddy
Films about siblings
2010s Telugu-language films
Films scored by Thaman S
Fictional portrayals of the Andhra Pradesh Police
Films shot in Switzerland
Films shot in Italy
Films shot at Ramoji Film City
2014 action comedy films